The Kozły Poznań (English: Goats Poznań) are an American football team based in Poznań, Poland, which currently competes in the Topliga, the top division of Polish American Football League. In 2018, the team has merged with other American Football team from Poznań - Patrioci Poznań. The new team plays as Armia Poznań.

History 
The team was founded in June 2005 and joined to the Polish American Football League in the 2007 season. 2009 PLFA season was the best season in the Kozły' history: they finished fourth in the regular season and was qualified to the post-season game (lost to The Crew Wrocław in the Semi-Final). 2009 season was the only winning Kozły' season (4-3).

Season-by-season records

See also 
 Sports in Poznań

References

External links 
 

American football teams in Poland
Sport in Poznań
American football teams established in 2005
2005 establishments in Poland